The Kekeamuan age is a period of geologic time (33.9–28.4 Ma) within the Early Oligocene Epoch of the Paleogene Period. It is used more specifically with Asian Land Mammal Ages. It follows the Houldjinian and precedes the Hsandagolian age.

The Kekeamuan's upper boundary is the approximate base of the Chattian age.

References

Oligocene